Ditto (or Dito) is an Italian term of Venetian origin coming from the Latin dicere, dictum ("to say, said"), meaning "already said" or "same thing" and sometimes abbreviated as dº, D°, do or Do. The Venetian trade popularized it in many countries in the form of "ditto", used to avoid repeating the name of a commodity already designated just before.

Ditto may refer to:

 Ditto mark ("), a typographic symbol indicating that the words/figures above it are to be repeated
 Ditto machine, or spirit duplicator, a 20th century printing method

Arts and entertainment
 Ditto (convention), an annual science fiction fanzine convention
 Ditto (1937 film), starring Buster Keaton
 Ditto (2000 film), a South Korean film
 Ditto (2022 film), a South Korean remake
 "Ditto" (song), a song by NewJeans
 "Ditto", a song on the 2006 album Cassie by Cassie
 Ditto (Ben 10), a character in the animated series
 Ditto (Pokémon), a Pokémon species
 Ditto, a fictional character in comic strip Hi and Lois

Businesses
 Ditto Music, an online music distribution company
 DITTO, a software company for eyewear companies 
 Ditto Bank, a former subsidiary of Finablr

People
 Beth Ditto (born 1981), singer of the band Gossip
 J. Kane Ditto (born 1944), former mayor of Jackson, Mississippi, U.S.
 Jessica Ditto (fl from 2004), American Republican staffer
 Richard Ditto (born 1934/35), American politician
 Ditto Ram (died 1944), Indian soldier awarded the GC
 Ditto Sarmiento (Abraham Sarmiento Jr., 1950–1977), Filipino student journalist
 D.Ditto (Dilshodbek Umidov, 1984) Uzbek singer and actor.

Other uses
 Ditto, Ouest, a place in Haiti
 Ditto (drive), a magnetic tape computer data storage system
 Ditto (horse) (1800–1821), a Thoroughbred racehorse
 Ditto suit, an early precursor of the lounge suit
 DittoTV, a former video-on-demand platform

See also
 
 Didi & Ditto, an edutainment software series